Anselmo Gianfanti (28 September 1857- 11 January 1907) was an Italian painter known for depiction of genre subjects and portraits. He was born in Cesena. He was a pupil of Domenico Morelli. He painted the Benedicamus Domini in the National Gallery of Modern Art in Rome. He also painted a Frati miniatore and various portraits.

He initially had gained a stipend to study at the Accademia di Belle Arti di Firenze, but by 1880 was in Naples with Morelli. He befriended the painters of Cesena, Paolo Grilli and Tullio Golfarelli. In Cesena, he also met Giosuè Carducci and Nazzareno Trovanelli. He died in Cesena of tuberculosis.

References

1857 births
1907 deaths
19th-century Italian painters
Italian male painters
20th-century Italian painters
20th-century Italian male artists
Accademia di Belle Arti di Napoli alumni
Painters from Naples
19th-century Italian male artists